Saint-Léonard-de-Portneuf is a municipality in the Capitale-Nationale region of Quebec, Canada.

Demographics
Population trend:
 Population in 2011: 1019 (2006 to 2011 population change: -2.6%)
 Population in 2006: 1046
 Population in 2001: 1010
 Population in 1996: 988
 Population in 1991: 997

Private dwellings occupied by usual residents: 449 (total dwellings: 635)

Mother tongue:
 English as first language: 0%
 French as first language: 98.1%
 English and French as first language: 0%
 Other as first language: 1.9%

References

External links

Incorporated places in Capitale-Nationale
Municipalities in Quebec